Other Truths is the sixth album from Do Make Say Think. It was released on 19 October 2009, in Europe and 20 October 2009, in the rest of the world.

Track listing

Personnel

Do Make Say Think
 Ohad Benchetrit – guitar, keyboard, horns
 Dave Mitchell – drums
 James Payment – drums
 Justin Small – guitar, keyboard
 Charles Spearin – guitar, bass, keyboard, horns

Other musicians
 Julie Penner – violin
 Michael Barth – trumpet
 Akron/Family & Lullabye Arkestra – vocals

Technical
 Do Make Say Think – producer
 Phil Demetro – mastering

References

External links
 Constellation Records website

2009 albums
Do Make Say Think albums
Constellation Records (Canada) albums